Lightning Triggers is a 1935 American Western film directed by S. Roy Luby and starring Reb Russell, Yvonne Pelletier and Fred Kohler.

Cast
 Reb Russell as Reb Russell
 Yvonne Pelletier as Marion
 Fred Kohler as Bull Thompson
 Jack Rockwell as Butch Greer
 Edmund Cobb as Blackie 
 Lillian Castle as Minerva Thompson
 Jerry Meacham as The Kid - Safecracker
 Dick Botiller as Juan - Henchman
 William McCall as Sheriff Tom
 Olin Francis as Deputy Ed
 Lew Meehan as Henchman 
 Artie Ortego as Henchman
 Victor Adamson as Barfly

References

Bibliography
 Michael R. Pitts. Poverty Row Studios, 1929–1940: An Illustrated History of 55 Independent Film Companies, with a Filmography for Each. McFarland & Company, 2005.

External links
 

1935 films
1935 Western (genre) films
American Western (genre) films
Films directed by S. Roy Luby
American black-and-white films
1930s English-language films
1930s American films